Panqiao Township is a rural township in Lengshuijiang, Loudi City, Hunan Province, People's Republic of China.

Administrative division
The township is divided into 14 villages and 1 community, the following areas: Guojia Community, Changchong Village, Hongyun Village, Jianxin Village, Jiujing Village, Laowu Village, Maoshan Village, Miaotian Village, Qiaotou Village, Shishan Village, Shuitang Village, Tongzhong Village, Yifang Village, Zhayang Village, and Dongshang Village (郭家社区、长冲村、洪云村、建新村、九井村、老屋村、茂山村、苗田村、桥头村、石山村、税塘村、铜钟村、义芳村、渣洋村、硐上村).

Historic township-level divisions of Lengshuijiang